NADH dehydrogenase (ubiquinone) 1 beta subcomplex, 5, 16kDa is a protein that in humans is encoded by the NDUFAB1 gene. The NDUFAB1 protein is a subunit of NADH dehydrogenase (ubiquinone), which is located in the mitochondrial inner membrane and is the largest of the five complexes of the electron transport chain.

Structure 

The NDUFAB1 gene is located on the p arm of chromosome 16 at position 12.2 and it spans 15,327 base pairs. The NDUFAB1 gene produces a 17.4 kDa protein composed of 156 amino acids. NDUFAB1 is a subunit of the enzyme NADH dehydrogenase (ubiquinone), the largest of the respiratory complexes. The structure is L-shaped with a long, hydrophobic transmembrane domain and a hydrophilic domain for the peripheral arm that includes all the known redox centers and the NADH binding site. NDUFAB1 is one of about 31 hydrophobic subunits that form the transmembrane region of Complex I. It has been noted that the N-terminal hydrophobic domain has the potential to be folded into an alpha helix spanning the inner mitochondrial membrane with a C-terminal hydrophilic domain interacting with globular subunits of Complex I. The highly conserved two-domain structure suggests that this feature is critical for the protein function and that the hydrophobic domain acts as an anchor for the NADH dehydrogenase (ubiquinone) complex at the inner mitochondrial membrane.

Function 

The human NDUFAB1 gene codes for a subunit of Complex I of the respiratory chain, which transfers electrons from NADH to ubiquinone. However, NDUFAB1 is an accessory subunit of the complex that is believed not to be involved in catalysis. Initially, NADH binds to Complex I and transfers two electrons to the isoalloxazine ring of the flavin mononucleotide (FMN) prosthetic arm to form FMNH2. The electrons are transferred through a series of iron-sulfur (Fe-S) clusters in the prosthetic arm and finally to coenzyme Q10 (CoQ), which is reduced to ubiquinol (CoQH2). The flow of electrons changes the redox state of the protein, resulting in a conformational change and pK shift of the ionizable side chain, which pumps four hydrogen ions out of the mitochondrial matrix.

Clinical Significance  
In a genome-wide association study (GWAS) meta-analysis conducted across European and African American populations, the NDUFAB1 gene and two other genes (MFAP3L and PALB2) were identified as genetic loci significantly associated with anxiety disorders (ADs). Since the comorbidity of ADs arises from their shared genetic basis, these candidate genetic loci may become therapeutic targets for AD treatments. Moreover, a study to identify small molecule drug targets for Tetralogy of Fallot (TOF), a congenital malformation of the heart, found the NDUFAB1 gene to be a major hub gene of differentially expressed genes in TOF.

References 

Proteins
Genes